The 1994–95 Copa Federación de España was the second edition of the Copa Federación de España, a knockout competition for Spanish football clubs, since its reinstatement.

Regional tournaments

Asturias tournament

Castile and León tournament

Competition

Round of 16

Quarterfinals

Semi-finals

Final

References
Results at Eldeportivo.es

Copa Federación de España seasons
Fed
Copa